The 2001 Leeward Islands Junior Championships in Athletics took place on May 5–6, 2001.  The event was held at the A. O. Shirley Recreation Ground in Road Town, Tortola, British Virgin Islands.

A total of 44 events were contested, 23 by boys and 21 by girls.

Medal summary
Medal winners can be found on the LIAA webpage courtesy Dean H. Greenaway from the British Virgin Islands Athletics Association.

Boys (U-20)

†: Open event for both U20 and U17 athletes.

Girls (U-20)

†: Open event for both U20 and U17 athletes.

Boys (U-17)

Girls (U-17)

Medal table (unofficial)

Team trophy
The scores for the team trophy were published.

Participation
Athletes from at least 7 countries participated.

References

2001
Leeward Islands Junior Championships
Leeward Islands Junior Championships
2001 in youth sport